Iason Chronis (born 17 January 1980), better known as Mason, is a Dutch DJ and producer. He had a number one on the UK Dance Singles Chart in 2007 with his track "Exceeder". Exceeder had originally been an instrumental and had received a vinyl-only release in the UK in 2006. The new version of the track, "Perfect (Exceeder)", was a mashup with American rapper Princess Superstar's song "Perfect" and reached number 3 on the national British chart in January 2007. The track was a big hit in many countries worldwide. He also had chart success in 2011 with his song "Runaway", which was a modern version of "Runaway" by Eruption, and "Boadicea", featuring Róisín Murphy,  in 2016 with "Fashion Killa" (feat Stefflon Don), and with many club releases since. Mason is the owner of the record label Animal Language.

Mason has released music on numerous electronic music labels, such as Island Records, Defected, Skint, Toolroom, Great Stuff Recordings and Fool's Gold Records, and remixed artists such as Moby, Steve Aoki, Hadouken!, Don Diablo, Mat Zo, 2Unlimited, Mylo, Metronomy, Tommy Trash, Martin Solveig, Robyn and Gabriella Cilmi.

Mason plays live shows as well as DJ sets and has performed at festivals such as Sensation White, Dance Valley, Tomorrowland, Nature One, Creamfields, Global Gathering and clubs such as Fabric, Ministry of Sound, Green Valley, Space Ibiza, Zouk, Octagon, Air and many others with over a thousand shows in more than 50 countries around the world. Mason is the organiser behind several parties throughout the Netherlands, including the Animal Language Kafe Rave and Avondwinkel at Club Nyx in Amsterdam. He is also on the board of Buma Cultuur and BAM! Popauteurs, representing Dutch pop and dance artists.

Biography
Iason Chronis was born in Amsterdam to a Dutch actress Adrienne Kleiweg and Greek sculptor Jorgos Chronis. Both his sisters have been TV actresses too.

Chronis began learning the violin at age 6. In 1987, he sang in the eighth version of the Kinderen voor Kinderen choir and would continue to do so until the twelfth edition in 1991.

In 1995, he started doing DJ performances, initially in and around Amsterdam but later abroad. In 1999, he took a four-year course in Music Composition and Performance, which he graduated with honours and for which he received an award from the Dutch Royal Family. He used his violin skills during his DJ sets between 1999 and 2005. During his world tour with Tiësto in 2004, he played the violin during a live performance of "Lethal Industry", as well as being Tiesto's warm up DJ. In 2006, Coen Berrier (born 17 April 1979) joined Mason in the studio and during live shows, but left Mason in spring 2014. Berrier has had earlier UK chart success with "Husan" by Bhangra Knights.

In 2008, Mason launched his own label Animal Language. In 2011, he released his debut album They Are Among Us, which featured collaborations with Róisín Murphy, DMC, Sam Sparro, Kurtis Blow and Aqualung. In 2014 the second Mason album ZOA was released, featuring Jocelyn Brown, Zoot Woman, Rouge Mary (Hercules & Love Affair) among other featured artists.

In 2015, his single "Papapapa" on Loulou Records reached the number 1 position on the online DJ store Beatport. In the same year, Mason released his Nite Rite series, a collection of numbered Nite Rites, released on each full moon. Nite Rite Ten featured Danielle Moore from the UK indie band Crazy P on vocals. He also collaborated on releases with German house acts Moonbootica and Sharam Jey and remixed fellow Dutch acts Kraak & Smaak, Janne Schra and Arling & Cameron that year.

In 2016, Mason signed to Island Records and began work on material with US hip hop artist Azealia Banks. However, after racial and homophobic comments by her on Twitter, he ceased the collaboration and started to work with UK grime artist Stefflon Don, which led to the "Fashion Killa" single release, that reached a number 4 position on the UK dance chart. This song was also used for television ads for Boohoo.com, Deezer and America's Next Top Model. The song was widely supported on BBC Radio 1 and other UK national radio stations. He also mixed and compiled the Toolroom Miami Poolside album this year, which was released on Toolroom Records.

In 2017, Mason got signed to house label Defected Records, which released his single "Rhino", which got chosen as "hottest record in the world" on BBC Radio 1. He also collaborated with UK tech house producer Betoko and has remixed Sting and James Hype.

Since 2018 Mason released 'Dance Shake Move' via Skint/BMG records. This record got used for TV ads for brands like Colgate and Vodafone. He has also collaborated with Alex Clare the UK/US top 10 vocalist on Spinnin Records, released his second single for Island records featuring UK grime act The Manor as well as a collaboration with UK vocalist Jem Cooke and Shingai Shoniwa from The Noisettes.  In 2019 he released 'Mason Remixed', a collection of his work remixed by artists such as Mike Mago, Junior Sanchez and Rex The Dog. In 2020 Mason released his third artist album 'Frisky Biscuits' on Toolroom Records. In 2021 he worked with The Metropole Orkest and released a collection of NFT's. His single 'Givin Up' together with Mark Knight became the #1 house record on Beatport that year.  
In 2022 he worked together with NY Hiphop artists Jungle Brothers Afrika Baby Bam and founded his own girl vocal trio 'The Masonettes', that accompany him on certain records and shows.

Discography

Albums

Track listings for select albums

Singles

2004
"Helikopter" EP               (Electrix)

2005
The "Screetch"                (Middle Of The Road)

2006
"Exceeder" / "Follow Me"         (Middle Of The Road)
"Exceeder"                (Great Stuff)
"Bigboy Exercises"           (Middle Of The Road)
"The Benedict Files"       (Aleph)

2007
"Perfect (Exceeder)" (featuring Princess Superstar)(Ministry Of Sound / Sony BMG)
"The Screetch"       (Great Stuff)
"Quarter"         (Great Stuff / Vendetta / Sound Division)

2008
"When Farmers Attack" (Malente Remix)   (Unique)
"Bermuda Triangle"         (Hysterical Ego)
"The Ridge"         (Great Stuff)

2009
"Kippschwinger" / "Amsterdam Tape"      (Animal Language)
"The Amsterdam Tape"         (Blanco y Negro)
"The Ridge" (Oliver Koletzki remix)      (Great Stuff)
"Front Row Chemistry" / "Capibara"      (Animal Language)
"At The Hippo Bar" / "Affra"       (Animal Language)
"Artex / "Intimate Express"       (Pickadoll)
"Ignite" / "Who Killed Trance"       (Animal Language)

2010
"Syncom" / "The Badger"     (Animal Language)
"Corrected" (featuring DMC & Sam Sparro) (Animal Language / Ministry Of Sound)
"You Are Not Alone"       (Animal Language)
"Runaway" / "Let’s Get Ferretic"    (Animal Language)

2011
"Runaway"      (Ministry Of Sound Australia)
"Boadicea" (featuring Róisín Murphy)   (Animal Language)
"Little Angel" (featuring Aqualung) (Animal Language)

2012
"Le Big Bob"                 (Animal Language)
"Superimposer"                (Animal Language)
"The Kickoff" / "Chihuahua"          (Animal Language)
"Solarium" - Mason & Marcos Valle     (Hysterical Ego)
"Animat"                   (Spinnin' Records)
"Doorman" / "Scaramouche"           (Animal Language)
"Get It Together"               (Fool's Gold)
"Bass Friend"                 (Cheap Thrills)

2013
"Wombat" / "Maybe"         (Animal Language) 
"Affected"      (BMKLTSCH RCRDS) 
"Solid Gold" (featuring Pien Feith)    (V2 Records)  
"Bubba"      (GND Records) 
"Grotto"      (Animal Language) 
"A Girl Like Me"     (Great Stuff) 
"Peer Pressure"     (Bad Life)  
"Roffelo" (from Drum Kids EP)    (Animal Language)

2014
"Get Back"      (Boys Noize Records)
"Someone I’m Not"     (Great Stuff)
"Savantas" / "Herd On The Scene"       (Animal Language)
"San Remo" / "Earmark"   (Animal Language)
"Gotta Have You Back"   (Animal Language)
"Salamander" / "Gotta Have You Back"   (Animal Language)
"Exceeder 2014 remixes"       (Armada Music)

2015
"Calabrese" / "Palmetto"      (Secure Recordings)
"Nite Rite One"     (Animal Language)
"My Love EP feat. Moonbootica"       (Animal Language)
"Nite Rite Two"     (Animal Language)
"Nite Rite Three"     (Animal Language)
"Papapapa"     (Loulou Records)
"Nite Rite Four"     (Animal Language)
"Diatonic / I Knocked For Days"     (Loulou Records)
"Nite Rite Five"     (Animal Language)
"Nite Rite Six"     (Animal Language)
"My Name Is feat. Sharam Jey "     (Bunny Tiger)
"Nite Rite Seven"     (Animal Language)
"Nite Rite Eight"     (Animal Language)
"Nite Rite Nine"     (Animal Language)

2016
"Bubblebath feat. Loulou Players"     (Loulou Records)
"Nite Rite Ten feat. Danielle Moore"     (Animal Language)
"Dance Bodies (feat. Plus Instruments)"     (Club Sweat)
"Do The Do"     (Toolroom)
"Wurrkit"      (Loulou Records)
"My Ritual / Let It Go"   (Animal Language)
"Fashion Killa"     (Island Records) UK) 
"Mason & Yolanda Be Cool - Xylophobia"   (Sweat It Out)
"Body Rock"   (Loulou Records)
"This Ain't No Disco EP"   (Bunny Tiger)
"Jigsaw"   (Bunny Tiger)
"Bubblebath feat. Loulou Players remixes"     (Loulou Records)
"I Like It"   (Animal Language)
"Live On Dreams"     (Kittball Records)

2017
"Everybody EP"     (Sweat It Out)
"Toucan"     (Animal Language)
"Rhino"     (Defected)
"Freaky Girlsss"     (Loulou Records)
"Mason & Betoko - Rumble In The Jungle / Amalia"     (Bunny Tiger)
"Chronology EP"     (Animal Language)

2018
"Take A Chance"     (Toolroom)
"Dance, Shake Move"     (Skint/BMG UK)
"Stop Start Slow Fast feat. The Manor"     (Island Records UK)
"Disruptor"     (Loulou Records)
"Reminders Of You" (featuring Alex Clare)    (Spinnin' Deep)

2019
"Banzai"     (Animal Language)
"Bang Bang"     (Animal Language)
"Drowning In Your Love feat. Jem Cooke"     (Another Rhythm)
"Amphibia EP"     (Reptile Dysfunction)
"Rhythm In My Brain"     (Toolroom)
"Take It Down feat Slang"     (Another Rhythm)
"Do I Look Ridiculous / Sparta"     (Loulou Records)

2020
"Mind Goes Off EP with DJ Glen"     (Animal Language)
"Nightwalker"     (Skint)
"Loosen Up"     (Toolroom)
"The Get Down"     (Toolroom)
"Drowning In Your Love feat. Jem Cooke - Mark Knight Remix"     (Toolroom)

2021

"Further Ado" (Toolroom Records)
"Givin Up" (Animal Language)
"March Of the Lizard" feat Metropole Orkest (Animal Language)
"Hush" (Reptile Dysfunction)
"Givin Up" vs Mark Knight (Toolroom Records)

2022
"Better On My Own" (Animal Language)
"The Wicked" feat Afrika Baby Bam (Armada)
"Changes" feat. The Masonettes (Deep Root)

Track listings for select maxi singles

Remixes

2005
Don Diablo - "Blow your speakers" (Mason Remix)    (Sellout Sessions)

2006
Malente - "Revolution" (Mason Remix)   (Unique)
Don Diablo - "Never 2 Late to die" (Mason Remix)   (Sellout Session)
Loft 17 - "So Ready" (Mason Remix)           (Molto)
Monoloop - "Hypersentual" Love (Mason Remix)       (Sugaspin)
Crime Club – "The Beast" (Mason Remix           (Tiger Records / Kontor)
Beatfreakz – "Superfreak" (Mason Remix) (Data / Ministry of Sound)
Patrick Alavi – "Quiet Punk" (Mason Remix)        (King Kong)
The Ordinary Boys – "Lonely at the Top" (Mason Remix) (B-Unique)
Joseph Armani presents: Corkscrew – "Elbow" (Mason Remix) (Craft Music)
The Age Of Steam - "Disco Mafia" (Mason Remix)  (CR2)

2007
Kid Dusty – "Constant Rising" (Mason Remix)        (Python)
Cygnus X – "The Orange Theme" (Terry Toner & Mason remix) (Be Yourself Music)
Don Diablo - "Blow your speakers" (Mason Remix)    (Ministry of Sound)
"Breathe" (Mason Remix)
Groove Rebels – "Breakpoint" (Mason Remix)        (Hammerskjoeld / Media)
Shocka – "Style Attract Play" (Mason Remix) (featuring Honeyshot) (Factory)
Freeform Five – "No More Conversations" (Mason Remix) (Universal)
Mazi & Duriez – "This Is Not A Follow Up" (Mason Remix)  (Brique Rouge)
DJ DLG – "XESS" (Mason Remix)               (Pickadoll)

2008
AKA the Junkies – "Konijntje" (Mason Remix) (Magnetron Music)
Noisia – "Gutterpump" (Mason Remix) (Skint)
Hadouken! – "Declaration Of War" (Mason Vocal / Dub mix)  (Atlantic)
Gabriella Cilmi – "Save the Lies" (Mason Vocal / Dub mix) (Warner)
Robyn – "Cobrastyle" (Mason Vocal Dub mix) (Konichiwa)
Moby – "Im In Love" (Mason's Glowsticks-Mix) (Mute)

2009
Martin Solveig – "One 2.3 Four" (Mason's Dark Disco Mix) (Mixture)
Tommy Trash – "Stay Close" (Mason mix)        (Ministry Of Sound Australia)
Rex The Dog – "Prototype" (Mason's Animal Language mix) (Hundahaus)

2010
JCA & TAI – "Yalla Yalla" (Mason remix) (Great Stuff)
Evil Nine – "Stay Up" (Mason remix)          (Gung-ho)
Nelsen Grover - "Awake" (Mason Remix)           (Animal Language)

2011
Glenn Morrison – "Tokyo Cries" (Mason's Smallroom Mix) (Blackhole)
Jesse Rose – "Non Stop" (Mason Remix)           (Made To Play)
Zoo Brazil – "Tear The Club Up" (Mason Remix)       (Refune)
Disco Of Doom – "Alice Cooper" (Mason's Schools Out Rework) (Discobelle Records)

2012
Nobody Beats The Drum - "Blood On My Hands" (Mason's Na Na Na Na Remix) (Basserk)
Steve Aoki & Angger Dimas - "Steve Jobs" (Mason Remix) (Dim Mak / Ultra)
Petite Noir - "Till We Ghosts" (Mason Remix)      (Bad Life)
Sharam Jey – "Put Ya!" (Mason Remix) (Disco Fisco)

2013
Wende – "Devils Pact" (Mason Remix)  (BMG)  
De Jeugd van Tegenwoordig – "De Formule" (Mason Remix) (Magnetron Music) 
2 Unlimited – "Tribal Dance" (Mason Remix)  (Armada)
Wannabe A Star – "PartyParty" (Mason's Downtempo Mix)  (STRFCKR) 
Headz Up – "Onoria" (Mason Remix)   (No Brainer)

2014
Bottin - Poison Within (Mason Remix)  (Bear Funk)
Yolanda Be Cool - Sugar Man (Mason Remix)  (Club Sweat) 
Worthy - Handle It (Mason Remix) (Anabatic Records) 
Stop Television - Change Strange (Mason Remix) (Animal Language)

2015
 Copy Club - The Sun, The Moon, The Stars (Mason Remix) (Spinnin')
 Janne Schra - Carry On (Mason Remix) (Embassy Of Music)
 Auxiliary Tha Masterfader - Feel For U (Mason Remix) (Animal Language)
 Arling & Cameron - Good Times (Mason Remix) (DUZT)
 Kraak & Smaak - All I Want Is You (Mason Remix) (Jalapeno Records)

2016
 Da Chick! – Do The Clap (Mason Remix) (Discotexas) 
 Jack Garratt – Worry (Mason Remix) (Island Records)
 Mat Zo – Sinful (Mason Remix) (Mad Zoo)
 Keljet ft. Holychild – What's Your Sign (Mason's Capricorn Remix) (Universal)
 Vanilla Ace & Neari – Watch Out Now (Mason's Favela Remix) (Mix Feed)
 Mighty Mi ft. Gran Puba – Shake With Me (Mason Remix) (Toolroom)
 Endor feat. Feral is Kinky – Fever (Mason Remix) (Warner Music)
 Cowgum - We Love Amy (Mason Remix)
 Falco Benz - Like Today (Mason Remix)  (Magnetron Music)

2017
 James Hype - More Than Friends (Mason Remix) (Warner UK) 
 1Click featuring Sting - Running Down Again (Mason Remix)
 Boy 8 Bit – Want You (Mason Remix) (Eton Messy)
 Jean Bacarezza & Loulou Records – Get Up (Mason Remix) (Bunny Tiger)

2018
 Beau Battant - Dance Alone (Mason & Joost van Bellen Remix) (Drive In) 
 Sharam Jey feat. Little Boots (Mason Remix) (Bunny Tiger)

2020
 Girl Ray - Friend Like That (Mason Remix) (Moshi Moshi) 
 Gettoblaster - Break Em Off (Mason Remix)

2021
 Mita & Biscuits - Tribalism (Mason Remix) (Toolroom Records
 Jeangu Macrooy - Birth Of A New Age (Mason Remix) (Unexpected Records) 

2022
 Aafke Romeijn - Piepschuim (Mason Remix) (Aafke Romeijn Records)

References
General

http://www.musicofmason.com
https://www.facebook.com/musicofmason
https://www.twitter.com/musicofmason
https://soundcloud.com/musicofmason
https://www.youtube.com/user/MasonAnimalLanguage
https://www.instagram.com/musicofmason
https://www.discogs.com/artist/303220-Mason
http://www.bigfishlittlefishmusic.com (Mason's manager)
http://www.amsbookings.com (Mason's booker)

Specific

Living people
Dutch dance musicians
Dutch house musicians
Dutch DJs
DJs from Amsterdam
Musicians from Amsterdam
1980 births
Electronic dance music DJs